Sphenomorphus loriae is a species of skink. It is found in Papua New Guinea.

References

loriae
Reptiles of Papua New Guinea
Reptiles described in 1897
Taxa named by George Albert Boulenger
Skinks of New Guinea